Hymenocephalus is a genus of flowering plants in the daisy family.

Species
There is only one known species, Hymenocephalus rigidus, native to Iran.

References

External links
Jstor Global Plants, Holotype of Hymenocephalus rigidus Jaub. & Spach

Endemic flora of Iran
Cynareae
Taxa named by Hippolyte François Jaubert